Sunriver Resort is a luxury resort and residential community in central Oregon, in the Pacific Northwest region of the United States. The common areas throughout the Sunriver resort community are managed by the Sunriver Owner's Association.

History

Sunriver's land used to be a lake bed, which dried out and became a meadow. It was a meeting place for Native Americans living in the area and was later adopted by settlers, trappers, and explorers, including Peter Skene Ogden, Kit Carson, and John Fremont, who led expeditions along the Deschutes River in the early-to-mid-19th century.
In 1943, the meadow was claimed as a training ground for combat construction battalions of the U.S. Army and was established as Camp Abbot. Construction was started on the camp in November 1942 and it officially opened when Colonel Frank S. Benson assumed command on May 12, 1943. It closed soon after D-Day in July 1944 and most of the buildings were razed. The officer's club, constructed from native logs and stones, was left standing and is now the "Great Hall," used for meetings and weddings. Following the war, the land returned to use as a cattle ranch until the mid-1960s.

In 1965, Donald V. McCallum (1918–1987), a Portland attorney, and John D. Gray (1919–2012), founder of Omark Industries, bought the land and planned to build a luxury resort on it. Their idea was to create a resort and residential community with a focus on maintaining the integrity of the environment, including creating a finite number of home sites. The first home site at Sunriver was sold on June 28, 1968, and ground was broken on the resort's lodge in mid-August, which opened in September 1969. The resort that McCallum and Gray established was bought in 1993 by Sunriver Resort Limited Partnership, who began an extensive capital improvement program.

The Resort

Sunriver Resort offers a variety of accommodations, including luxury guest rooms and suites, as well as 400 vacation rental properties. It has five dining areas, three tennis facilities, family recreation, and is home to the Sage Springs Club and Spa.

The resort is home to three golf courses: Meadows, Woodlands, and Crosswater.  Crosswater, named one of "America's 100 Greatest Courses" by Golf Digest, and was the home of the JELD-WEN Tradition, a major championship on the Champions Tour from 2007 to 2010.  The Meadows golf course was designed by acclaimed architect John Fought and the Woodlands golf course was designed by the renowned architect Robert Trent Jones Jr.

The region's primary winter attraction, Mount Bachelor ski area, is about 20 minutes away by vehicle.

References

External links 
Sunriver Resort
Sunriver Area Chamber of Commerce
Environmentally Conscious Design: A Case Study of Sunriver, Oregon
Willamette Week: John Gray (1919–2012)

Buildings and structures in Deschutes County, Oregon
Hotels in Oregon
Resorts in Oregon
Tourist attractions in Deschutes County, Oregon
1968 establishments in Oregon